Denton Glacier is a small hanging glacier which drains the northwest slopes of Mount Newall and terminates on the south wall of Wright Valley, Victoria Land. It was named by U.S. geologist Robert Nichols for George H. Denton, geological assistant to Nichols at nearby Marble Point in the 1958–59 field season.

References

Glaciers of McMurdo Dry Valleys